A generation refers to all of the people born and living at about the same time, regarded collectively. It can also be described as, "the average period, generally considered to be about 20–⁠30 years, during which children are born and grow up, become adults, and begin to have children." In kinship terminology, it is a structural term designating the parent-child relationship. It is known as biogenesis, reproduction, or procreation in the biological sciences.

Generation is also often used synonymously with birth/age cohort in demographics, marketing, and social science; under this formulation it means "people within a delineated population who experience the same significant events within a given period of time." Generations in this sense of birth cohort, also known as "social generations", are widely used in popular culture, and have been the basis for sociological analysis. Serious analysis of generations began in the nineteenth century, emerging from an increasing awareness of the possibility of permanent social change and the idea of youthful rebellion against the established social order. Some analysts believe that a generation is one of the fundamental social categories in a society, while others view its importance as being overshadowed by other factors including class, gender, race, and education, among others.

Etymology
The word generate comes from the Latin generāre, meaning "to beget". The word generation as a group or cohort in social science signifies the entire body of individuals born and living at about the same time, most of whom are approximately the same age and have similar ideas, problems, and attitudes (e.g., Beat Generation and Lost Generation).

Familial generation

A familial generation is a group of living beings constituting a single step in the line of descent from an ancestor. In developed nations the average familial generation length is in the high 20s and has even reached 30 years in some nations. Factors such as greater industrialisation and demand for cheap labour, urbanisation, delayed first pregnancy and a greater uncertainty in both employment income and relationship stability have all contributed to the increase of the generation length from the late 18th century to the present. These changes can be attributed to social factors, such as GDP and state policy, globalization, automation, and related individual-level variables, particularly a woman's educational attainment. Conversely, in less-developed nations, generation length has changed little and remains in the low 20s.

An intergenerational rift in the nuclear family, between the parents and two or more of their children, is one of several possible dynamics of a dysfunctional family. Coalitions in families are subsystems within families with more rigid boundaries and are thought to be a sign of family dysfunction.

Social generation
Social generations are cohorts of people born in the same date range and who share similar cultural experiences.
The idea of a social generation has a long history and can be found in ancient literature, but did not gain currency in the sense that it is used today until the 19th century. Prior to that the concept "generation" had generally referred to family relationships and not broader social groupings. In 1863, French lexicographer Emile Littré had defined a generation as "all people coexisting in society at any given time."

Several trends promoted a new idea of generations, as the 19th century wore on, of a society divided into different categories of people based on age. These trends were all related to the processes of modernisation, industrialisation, or westernisation, which had been changing the face of Europe since the mid-18th century. One was a change in mentality about time and social change. The increasing prevalence of enlightenment ideas encouraged the idea that society and life were changeable, and that civilization could progress. This encouraged the equation of youth with social renewal and change. Political rhetoric in the 19th century often focused on the renewing power of youth influenced by movements such as Young Italy, Young Germany, Sturm und Drang, the German Youth Movement, and other romantic movements. By the end of the 19th century, European intellectuals were disposed toward thinking of the world in generational terms—in terms of youth rebellion and emancipation.

Two important contributing factors to the change in mentality were the change in the economic structure of society. Because of the rapid social and economic change, young men particularly were less beholden to their fathers and family authority than they had been. Greater social and economic mobility allowed them to flout their authority to a much greater extent than had traditionally been possible. Additionally, the skills and wisdom of fathers were often less valuable than they had been due to technological and social change. During this time, the period between childhood and adulthood, usually spent at university or in military service, was also increased for many people entering white-collar jobs. This category of people was very influential in spreading the ideas of youthful renewal.

Another important factor was the breakdown of traditional social and regional identifications. The spread of nationalism and many of the factors that created it (a national press, linguistic homogenisation, public education, suppression of local particularities) encouraged a broader sense of belonging beyond local affiliations. People thought of themselves increasingly as part of a society, and this encouraged identification with groups beyond the local. Auguste Comte was the first philosopher to make a serious attempt to systematically study generations. In Cours de philosophie positive, Comte suggested that social change is determined by generational change and in particular conflict between successive generations. As the members of a given generation age, their "instinct of social conservation" becomes stronger, which inevitably and necessarily brings them into conflict with the "normal attribute of youth"—innovation. Other important theorists of the 19th century were John Stuart Mill and Wilhelm Dilthey.

Generational theory
Sociologist Karl Mannheim was a seminal figure in the study of generations. He elaborated a theory of generations in his 1923 essay The Problem of Generations. He suggested that there had been a division into two primary schools of study of generations until that time. Firstly, positivists such as Comte measured social change in designated life spans. Mannheim argued that this reduced history to "a chronological table". The other school, the "romantic-historical" was represented by Dilthey and Martin Heidegger. This school focused on the individual qualitative experience at the expense of social context. Mannheim emphasised that the rapidity of social change in youth was crucial to the formation of generations, and that not every generation would come to see itself as distinct. In periods of rapid social change a generation would be much more likely to develop a cohesive character. He also believed that a number of distinct sub-generations could exist. According to Gilleard and Higgs, Mannheim identified three commonalities that a generation shares:
Shared temporal location – generational site or birth cohort
Shared historical location – generation as actuality or exposure to a common era
Shared sociocultural location – generational consciousness or "entelechy"

Authors William Strauss and Neil Howe developed the Strauss–Howe generational theory outlining what they saw as a pattern of generations repeating throughout American history. This theory became quite influential with the public and reignited an interest in the sociology of generations. This led to the creation of an industry of consulting, publishing, and marketing in the field (corporations spent approximately 70 million dollars on generational consulting in the U.S. in 2015). The theory has alternatively been criticized by social scientists and journalists who argue it is non-falsifiable, deterministic, and unsupported by rigorous evidence.

There are psychological and sociological dimensions in the sense of belonging and identity which may define a generation. The concept of a generation can be used to locate particular birth cohorts in specific historical and cultural circumstances, such as the "Baby boomers". Historian Hans Jaeger shows that, during the concept's long history, two schools of thought coalesced regarding how generations form: the "pulse-rate hypothesis" and the "imprint hypothesis." According to the pulse-rate hypothesis, a society's entire population can be divided into a series of non-overlapping cohorts, each of which develops a unique "peer personality" because of the time period in which each cohort came of age. The movement of these cohorts from one life-stage to the next creates a repeating cycle that shapes the history of that society. A prominent example of pulse-rate generational theory is Strauss and Howe's theory. Social scientists tend to reject the pulse-rate hypothesis because, as Jaeger explains, "the concrete results of the theory of the universal pulse rate of history are, of course, very modest. With a few exceptions, the same goes for the partial pulse-rate theories. Since they generally gather data without any knowledge of statistical principles, the authors are often least likely to notice to what extent the jungle of names and numbers which they present lacks any convincing organization according to generations."

Social scientists follow the "imprint hypothesis" of generations (i.e., that major historical events — such as the Vietnam War, the September 11 attacks, the COVID-19 pandemic, etc. — leave an "imprint" on the generation experiencing them at a young age), which can be traced to Karl Mannheim's theory. According to the imprint hypothesis, generations are only produced by specific historical events that cause young people to perceive the world differently than their elders. Thus, not everyone may be part of a generation; only those who share a unique social and biographical experience of an important historical moment will become part of a "generation as an actuality." When following the imprint hypothesis, social scientists face a number of challenges. They cannot accept the labels and chronological boundaries of generations that come from the pulse-rate hypothesis (like Generation X or Millennial); instead, the chronological boundaries of generations must be determined inductively and who is part of the generation must be determined through historical, quantitative, and qualitative analysis.

While all generations have similarities, there are differences among them as well. A 2007 Pew Research Center report called "Millennials: Confident. Connected. Open to Change" noted the challenge of studying generations: "Generational analysis has a long and distinguished place in social science, and we cast our lot with those scholars who believe it is not only possible, but often highly illuminating, to search for the unique and distinctive characteristics of any given age group of Americans. But we also know this is not an exact science. We are mindful that there are as many differences in attitudes, values, behaviors, and lifestyles within a generation as there are between generations. But we believe this reality does not diminish the value of generational analysis; it merely adds to its richness and complexity." Another element of generational theory is recognizing how youth experience their generation, and how that changes based on where they reside in the world. "Analyzing young people's experiences in place contributes to a deeper understanding of the processes of individualization, inequality, and of generation." Being able to take a closer looks at youth cultures and subcultures in different times and places adds an extra element to understanding the everyday lives of youth. This allows a better understanding of youth and the way generation and place play in their development. It is not where the birth cohort boundaries are drawn that is important, but how individuals and societies interpret the boundaries and how divisions may shape processes and outcomes. However, the practice of categorizing age cohorts is useful to researchers for the purpose of constructing boundaries in their work.

Generational tension

Norman Ryder, writing in American Sociological Review in 1965, shed light on the sociology of the discord between generations by suggesting that society "persists despite the mortality of its individual members, through processes of demographic metabolism and particularly the annual infusion of birth cohorts". He argued that generations may sometimes be a "threat to stability" but at the same time they represent "the opportunity for social transformation". Ryder attempted to understand the dynamics at play between generations.

Amanda Grenier, in a 2007 essay published in Journal of Social Issues, offered another source of explanation for why generational tensions exist. Grenier asserted that generations develop their own linguistic models that contribute to misunderstanding between age cohorts, "Different ways of speaking exercised by older and younger people exist, and may be partially explained by social historical reference points, culturally determined experiences, and individual interpretations".

Karl Mannheim, in his 1952 book Essays on the Sociology of Knowledge asserted the belief that people are shaped through lived experiences as a result of social change. Howe and Strauss also have written on the similarities of people within a generation being attributed to social change. Based on the way these lived experiences shape a generation in regard to values, the result is that the new generation will challenge the older generation's values, resulting in tension. This challenge between generations and the tension that arises is a defining point for understanding generations and what separates them.

Criticism
Philip N. Cohen, a sociology professor at the University of Maryland, criticized the use of "generation labels", stating that the labels are "imposed by survey researchers, journalists or marketing firms" and "drive people toward stereotyping and rash character judgment." Cohen's open letter, which outlines his criticism of generational labels, received at least 150 signatures from other demographers and social scientists.

Louis Menand, writer at The New Yorker, stated that "there is no empirical basis" for the contention "that differences within a generation are smaller than differences between generations." He argued that generational theories "seem to require" that people born at the tail end of one generation and people born at the beginning of another (e.g. a person born in 1965, the first year of Generation X, and a person born in 1964, the last of the Boomer era) "must have different values, tastes, and life experiences" or that people born in the first and last birth years of a generation (e.g. a person born in 1980, the last year of Generation X, and a person born in 1965, the first year of Generation X) "have more in common" than with people born a couple years before or after them.

List of social generations

Western world

The Western world includes Western Europe, the Americas, and Australasia. Many variations may exist within these regions, both geographically and culturally, which means that the list is broadly indicative, but very general. The contemporary characterization of these cohorts used in media and advertising borrows, in part, from the Strauss–Howe generational theory and generally follows the logic of the pulse-rate hypothesis.
The Lost Generation, also known as the "Generation of 1914" in Europe, is a term originating from Gertrude Stein to describe those who fought in World War I. The Lost Generation is defined as the cohort born from 1883 to 1900 who came of age during World War I and the Roaring Twenties.
The Greatest Generation, also known as the "G.I. Generation", includes the veterans who fought in World War II. They were born from 1901 to 1927; older G.I.s (or the Interbellum Generation) came of age during the Roaring Twenties, while younger G.I.s came of age during the Great Depression and World War II. Journalist Tom Brokaw wrote about American members of this cohort in his book The Greatest Generation, which popularized the term.
The Silent Generation, also known as the "Lucky Few", is the cohort who came of age in the post–World War II era. They were born from 1928 to 1945. In the U.S., this group includes most of those who may have fought the Korean War and many of those who may have fought during the Vietnam War.
Baby boomers are the people born following World War II from 1946 to 1964. Increased birth rates were observed during the post–World War II baby boom, making them a relatively large demographic cohort. In the U.S., many older boomers may have fought in the Vietnam War or participated in the counterculture of the 1960s, while younger boomers (or Generation Jones) came of age in the "malaise" years of the 1970s.
Generation X (or Gen X for short) is the cohort following the baby boomers. The generation is generally defined as people born between 1965 and 1980. The term has also been used in different times and places for a number of different subcultures or countercultures since the 1950s. In the U.S., some called Xers the "baby bust" generation because of a drop in birth rates following the baby boom.
Millennials, also known as Generation Y (or Gen Y for short), are the generation following Generation X who grew up around the turn of the 3rd millennium. This generation is typically defined as those born from 1981 to 1996. The Pew Research Center reported that Millennials surpassed the Baby Boomers in U.S. numbers in 2019, with an estimated 71.6 million Boomers and 72.1 million Millennials.
Generation Z (or Gen Z for short and colloquially as "Zoomers"), are the people succeeding the Millennials. Pew Research Center describes Generation Z as spanning from 1997 to 2012. Both the United States Library of Congress and Statistics Canada have cited Pew's definition of 1997–2012 for Generation Z. In a 2022 report, the U.S. Census designates Generation Z as those born 1997 to 2013. The Australian Bureau of Statistics uses 1996 to 2010 to define Generation Z in a 2022 publication.
Generation Alpha (or Gen Alpha for short) are the generation succeeding Generation Z. Researchers and popular media typically use the early 2010s as starting birth years and the mid-2020s as ending birth years. Generation Alpha is the first to be born entirely in the 21st century. As of 2015, there were some two-and-a-half million people born every week around the globe, and Gen Alpha is expected to reach two billion in size by 2025.

Other areas
In Armenia, people born after the country's independence from the Soviet Union in 1991 are known as the "Independence generation".
In Bulgaria, people born in the final years of communism and early years of democracy (mid-1980s to mid-1990s) are known as "the children of the transition". They are believed to have had a difficult time adapting, due to many changes in the country occurring along the same time period as them growing up into adulthood. Regime and economic changes, shifts from eastern to western cultural values and influences, among other factors, were things their parents from previous generations, could not prepare them for.
In the Czech Republic and Slovakia, the generation of people born in Czechoslovakia during the baby boom which started in the early 1970s, during the period of "normalization" are called "Husák's children". The generation was named after the President and long-term Communist leader of Czechoslovakia, Gustáv Husák. This was due to his political program to boost the growth of population.
In the People's Republic of China, the "Post-80s" (Chinese: 八零后世代 or 八零后) (born-after-1980 generation) are those who were born in the 1980s in urban areas of Mainland China. Growing up in modern China, the Post-80s has been characterised by its optimism for the future, newfound excitement for consumerism and entrepreneurship and acceptance of its historic role in transforming modern China into an economic power. There is also the similarly named "Post-90s" (Chinese: 九零后), those born in the post-Tiananmen era of the 1990s. A broader generational classification would be the "one-child generation" born between the introduction of the one-child policy in 1980 and its softening into a "two-child policy" in 2013. The lack of siblings has had profound psychological effects on this generation, such as egoism due to always being at the centre of parents' attention as well as the stress of having to be the sole provider once the parents retire.
People born post-1980s in Hong Kong are for the most part different from the same generation in mainland China. The term "Post-80s" (zh: 八十後) came into use in Hong Kong between 2009 and 2010, particularly during the opposition to the Guangzhou-Hong Kong Express Rail Link, during which a group of young activists came to the forefront of Hong Kong's political scene. They are said to be "post-materialist" in outlook, and they are particularly vocal in issues such as urban development, culture and heritage, and political reform. Their campaigns include the fight for the preservation of Lee Tung Street, the Star Ferry Pier and the Queen's Pier, Choi Yuen Tsuen Village, real political reform (on 23 June), and a citizen-oriented Kowloon West Art district. Their discourse mainly develops around themes such as anti-colonialism, sustainable development, and democracy.
In Israel, where most Ashkenazi Jews born before the end of World War II were Holocaust survivors, children of survivors and people who survived as babies are sometimes referred to as the "second generation (of Holocaust survivors)" (Hebrew: דור שני לניצולי שואה, dor sheni lenitsolei shoah; or more often just דור שני לשואה, dor sheni lashoah, literally "second generation to the Holocaust"). This term is particularly common in the context of psychological, social, and political implications of the individual and national transgenerational trauma caused by the Holocaust. Some researchers have also found signs of trauma in third-generation Holocaust survivors.
In Norway, the term "the dessert generation" has been applied to the baby boomers and every generation afterwards.
In Singapore, people born before 1949 are referred to as the "Pioneer Generation" for their contributions to Singapore during the nation's earliest years. Likewise, those born between 1950 and 1959 are referred to as the "Merdeka Generation" as their formative years were during the political turbulence of the 1950s to 1960s in Singapore.
In South Africa, people born after the 1994 general election, the first after apartheid was ended, are often referred to in media as the "born-free generation". People born after the year 2000 are often referred to as "Ama2000", a term popularized by music and a Coca-Cola advert.
In South Korea, generational cohorts are often defined around the democratization of the country, with various schemes suggested including names such as the "democratization generation", 386 generation (named after Intel 386 computer in the 1990s to describe people in their late 30s and early 40s who were born in the 1960s, and attended university/college in the 1980s, also called the "June 3, 1987 generation"), that witnessed the June uprising, the "April 19 generation" (that struggled against the Syngman Rhee regime in 1960), the "June 3 generation" (that struggled against the normalization treaty with Japan in 1964), the "1969 generation" (that struggled against the constitutional revision allowing three presidential terms), and the shin-se-dae ("new") generation. The term Shin-se-dae generation refers to the generation following Millennials in the Korean language. The Shin-se-dae generation are mostly free from ideological or political bias.
In India, generations tend to follow a pattern similar to the broad Western model, although there are still major differences, especially in the older generations. One interpretation sees India's independence in 1947 as India's major generational shift. People born in the 1930s and 1940s tended to be loyal to the new state and tended to adhere to "traditional" divisions of society. Indian "boomers", those born after independence and into the early 1960s, witnessed events like the Indian Emergency between 1975 and 1977 which made a number of them somewhat skeptical of the government.
In the Philippines people born before or during the Second World War (as well as those living as adults in that period) constituting an unofficial generation. "Martial Law Babies" are generally defined as people born in the time period between the imposition of Martial Law by President Ferdinand Marcos on 21 September 1972 and its formal lifting in January 1981. The term is sometimes extended to anyone born within Marcos' entire 21-year rule, while those born after the 1986 People Power Revolution that toppled the regime are sometimes termed "EDSA Babies".
In Russia, characteristics of Russian generations are determined by fateful historical events that significantly change either the foundations of the life of the country as a whole or the rules of life in a certain period of time. Names and given descriptions of Russian generations: the Generation of Winners, the generation of the Cold War, the generation of Perestroika, the first non-Soviet generation (the children of Perestroika, the Witnesses of Perestroika), the digital generation.
In Sweden, it is common to talk about people based on the decades of their births: "40-talist" (a person that was born in the 1940s), "50-talist" (a person that was born in the 1950s), etc.
In Taiwan, the term Strawberry generation refers to Taiwanese people born after 1981 who "bruise easily" like strawberries – meaning they can not withstand social pressure or work hard like their parents' generation; the term refers to people who are insubordinate, spoiled, selfish, arrogant, and sluggish in work.

Other terminology
The term generation is sometimes applied to a cultural movement, or more narrowly defined group than an entire demographic. Some examples include:
The Stolen Generations, refers to children of Aboriginal Australians and Torres Strait Islander descent, who were forcibly removed from their families by Australian federal and state government agencies and church missions, under Acts of their respective parliaments between approximately 1869 and 1969.
The Beat Generation, refers to a popular American cultural movement widely cited by social scholars as having laid the foundation of the pro-active American counterculture of the 1960s. It consisted of Americans born between the two world wars who came of age in the rise of the automobile era, and the surrounding accessibility they brought to the culturally diverse, yet geographically broad and separated nation.
Generation Jones is a term coined by Jonathan Pontell to describe the cohort of people born between 1954 and 1965. The term is used primarily in English-speaking countries. Pontell defined Generation Jones as referring to the second half of the post–World War II baby boom. The term also includes first-wave Generation X.
MTV Generation, a term referring to the adolescents and young adults of the 1980s and early-mid 1990s who were heavily influenced by the MTV television channel. It is often used synonymously with Generation X.
In Europe, a variety of terms have emerged in different countries particularly hard hit following the financial crisis of 2007–2008 to designate young people with limited employment and career prospects. 
The Generation of 500 is a term popularized by the Greek mass media and refers to educated Greek twixters of urban centers who generally fail to establish a career. Young adults are usually forced into underemployment in temporary and occasional jobs, unrelated to their educational background, and receive the minimum allowable base salary of €500. This generation evolved in circumstances leading to the Greek debt crisis and participated in the 2010–2011 Greek protests.
In Spain, they are referred to as the mileuristas (for €1,000, "the thousand-euro-ists").
In Portugal, they are called the Geração à Rasca (the "Scraping-By Generation"); a twist on the older term Geração Rasca ("the Lousy Generation") used by detractors to refer to student demonstrations in the 1990s against Education Ministers António Couto dos Santos and later Manuela Ferreira Leite.
In France, Génération précaire ("The Precarious Generation").
In Italy also the generation of 1,000 euros.
Xennials, Oregon Trail Generation, and Generation Catalano are terms used to describe individuals born during Generation X/Millennial cusp years. Xennials is a portmanteau blending the words Generation X and Millennials to describe a microgeneration of people born from the late 1970s to early 1980s.
Zillennials, Zennials, Snapchat Generation, and MinionZ are terms used to describe individuals born during the Millennial/Generation Z cusp years. Zillennials is a portmanteau blending the words Millennials and Generation Z to describe a microgeneration of people born from the early 1990s to the early 2000s.

See also

Age set
Generational accounting
Generationism
Intergenerational equity
Intergenerationality
Transgenerational design
Cusper

References

Further reading

Ulrike Jureit: Generation, Generationality, Generational Research, version: 2, in: Docupedia Zeitgeschichte, 09. August 2017

Demographics
Cultural generations